Pioneer Aerospace Corporation is an aerodynamic deceleration manufacturer.

Pioneer has designed and manufactured parachutes and parafoils for numerous NASA missions.

History
Pioneer Aerospace Corporation began production in 1938. In 1988, Pioneer become a part of Zodiac's Aerosafety Systems Group. Pioneer's main factory and distribution centers are located in Columbia, Mississippi and Bloomfield, Connecticut. On December 1st, 2018 Safran acquired Zodiac Aerospace as Safran Aerosystems. The company is one of the largest aerodynamic deceleration manufacturers in the world.

NASA
Pioneer Aerospace Corporation has designed and manufactured recovery systems for numerous NASA missions, including: the Galileo probe, the Space Shuttle, the  Mars Pathfinder missions, the Genesis solar-sample mission, the Stardust Comet Intercept Probe, and the Mars Exploration Rovers. In 1999, Pioneer manufactured, at the time, the world's largest parafoil (7,500 square ft.) for the X-38 Crew Return Vehicle, an emergency return capsule for the crew of the International Space Station.

References

Aerospace companies of the United States